The , stylized as LEAF, is a compact five-door hatchback battery electric vehicle (BEV) manufactured by Nissan. It was introduced in Japan and the United States in December 2010, and its second generation was introduced in October 2017.

Among other awards and recognition, the Leaf has won the 2010 Green Car Vision Award, the 2011 European Car of the Year, the 2011 World Car of the Year, and the 2011–2012 Car of the Year Japan. Global sales totaled 577,000 Leafs by February 2022. , European sales totaled more than 208,000 units, and, over 165,000 units had been sold in the U.S., and 157,000 in Japan. The Leaf listed as the world's all-time top selling plug-in electric car through December 2019. The Tesla Model 3 surpassed the Leaf in early 2020 to become the all-time best selling electric car.



First generation (ZE0/AZE0; 2010)

Design

Nissan sought to make the Leaf appealing to mainstream drivers by giving it a familiar five-door hatchback design. The body has a sharp V-shape design with large, up slanting headlights that split and redirect airflow away from the door mirrors, and the bottom of the car has aerodynamic panelling. The battery, the heaviest part of most electric vehicles, is situated below the seats and rear foot space, keeping the center of gravity as low as possible and giving the car better structural rigidity than a conventional five-door hatchback.

The battery is manufactured by Automotive Energy Supply Corporation. It's guaranteed for eight years or 100,000 miles in the USA, and 100 000 km or 5 years in Europe. In 2011, Nissan estimated that the battery would have a lifetime of at least 10 years, with 80% usable capacity remaining after five years. In 2019, based on data gathered from over 400,000 Leafs sold in Europe, Nissan stated that the battery would last 22 years, outlasting the vehicle by 10-12 years.

There is no active cooling of the battery pack, only passive cooling by radiation.

There is a battery refurbishment program in Japan, but not in the US.

According to a 2015 report by Warranty Direct, of 35,000 Leafs sold in Europe, three had had a battery failure for a rate of 0.01%, for internal combustion engined cars the failure rate is 25 times higher.

The Leaf is generally cheaper to operate than internal combustion engine and hybrid cars. However, since the Leaf costs significantly more than similar internal combustion vehicles, it may take longer for the fuel savings to cancel out the increased initial cost, even after government incentives for plug-in electric vehicles.

Some vehicles initially came equipped with the telematics system CarWings. From 2011 to 2015 this used the 2G cellular network. 2G has been decommissioned in many areas, requiring an upgrade of the telematic control unit to use newer networks. Rebranded NissanConnectEV in 2016, it is provided free of charge to owners, if equipped, depending on year and model. As of 2017 it offers GPS data for routing, and for locating charging stations. It may also provide two-way communication with the car which enables remote control of the climate system, and monitoring of charging status.

Model and production history
Nissan electric vehicles have existed since 1946. The Leaf was preceded by the low-volume Altra station wagon (1997–2001) and Hypermini microcar (1999–2001).

2011/12
US-market SV and SL trims had an SAE J1772 connector for (120/240 volts AC). The SL trim had an optional CHAdeMO port with which it can be charged from fully discharged to 80% capacity in about 30 minutes. Nissan warns that if fast charging is the primary way of recharging, then the normal and gradual battery capacity loss is about 10% more than regular 240-volt charging over a 10-year period. Other companies make compatible charging stations, and companies and local government have various initiatives to create electric vehicle networks of public charging stations.

The motoring press has reported a 0 to 60 mph (97 km/h) acceleration time of 9.9 seconds.

About a dozen Leaf Nismo RC (Racing Competition) vehicles were produced, custom built race cars with the same motor (but with somewhat increased output) but no other shared components. Endurance at racing speeds is only 20 minutes. Six examples of a later version called the NISMO LEAF RC_02 are further altered by using dual  motors to create a four-wheel-drive racing vehicle.

2013
By March, Nissan had plants at Smyrna, Tennessee, Oppama, Japan, and Sunderland, England, with production of 150,000, 50,000, and 50,000 respectively.

The 2013 Leaf has extended range due to a more efficient heating system, better regenerative braking, weight reduction, and improved aerodynamics.

The 2013 model year Leaf has a dashboard display of the battery's charge percentage. A 6.6-kW onboard charger, available as an extra-cost option on the base model, reduces charging times using 240-volt power, so a charge from empty to full takes about four hours, instead of seven. The onboard charger is more compact and located under the hood, increasing cargo volume.

In November, Nissan demonstrated on public roads a Leaf-based driverless car.

There are three trim levels. A new trim level, Leaf S, has a lower price, 16-inch steel wheels, and fewer accessories.

In Europe, Nissan offered a battery leasing option for all trims produced at Sunderland, which lowered the price.

2014/15

The 2014 Leaf is largely the same as the 2013 model year except for standard rear-view monitor and updated EV-IT functionality with voice destination entry and SMS readout.

In China, Dongfeng-Nissan's Leaf-based Venucia e30 went on sale in September.

2016
Beginning in late 2016, all three trims (S, SV, and SL) came equipped with both charging receptacles.

The S trim initially kept the 24 kWh battery found in earlier Leafs, and received the upgrade midway through the 2016 model year.

This means that if a car lost four of the 12 bars on its capacity gauge before that period is up, Nissan would replace or repair the battery free of charge.

2017
Global sales in 2017 fell to about 47,000 units, in anticipation of the second generation. , the Leaf was available in more than 60 countries in four continents.

Environmental footprint
In February 2014, the Automotive Science Group (ASG) published the result of a study conducted to assess the life-cycle of over 1,300 automobiles across nine categories sold in North America. The study found that among advanced automotive technologies, the Nissan Leaf holds the smallest life-cycle environmental footprint of any model year 2014 automobile available in the North American market with minimum four-person occupancy. The study concluded that the increased environmental impacts of manufacturing the battery electric technology are more than offset with increased environmental performance during operational life. For the assessment, the study used the average electricity mix of the U.S. grid in 2014.

In December 2014, Nissan announced that Leaf owners have accumulated together 1 billion kilometers (625 million miles) driven. This amount of electric distance translates into avoiding 180 million kilograms of  emissions by driving an electric car in comparison to travelling with a gasoline-powered car. In December 2016, Nissan reported that Leaf owners worldwide achieved the milestone of 3 billion kilometers (1.9 billion miles) driven collectively through November 2016, saving nearly 500 million kilograms of  emissions.

Models with an on-board 3.6 kW charger can be fully charged in eight hours from an appropriate 240-volt charger, while models with an on-board 6.6 kW charger can be fully recharged in 4 hours.

In July 2019, Green NCAP assessed 2019 40 kWh N-CONNECTA Nissan Leaf, noting that the eco driving mode made no noticeable difference in energy consumption, and noting that the car's average and maximum energy consumption were bettered by the Hyundai Ioniq.

Replacement battery packs 

After the original battery packs degrade, owners may wish to refurbish, replace, or upgrade their battery packs instead of purchasing a new electric car. However, there are few options globally for this process. In August 2019, Automotive News reported that "more than a year after launching a battery refurbishment program for Leaf customers in Japan, Nissan remains noncommittal about offering the program in the brand's largest market — the U.S." Nissan previously offered a replacement battery back for the Leaf for $5,499 plus installation in the U.S., but then later raised the price to $8,500. As of January 2020, Leaf owners began reporting that Nissan had lowered the cost of the 24 kWh batteries to $5,500, with a $1,000 trade-in credit for the return of the original battery, making the battery $4,500 plus the cost of labor and tax."A spokesman with Nissan Canada confirmed with the National Post that a replacement battery for a 2011 to 2017 Nissan Leaf retails at $11,533 plus installation for both the 24 kWh version and the 40 kWh version."

Safety 

NHTSA rates the 2011 and 2012 model years as five out of five stars overall. It won the Insurance Institute for Highway Safety's "Top Safety Pick" in 2011. It received top ratings of "Good" for front, side, and rear impact crash tests, and also on rollover protection. All injury measurements except one were rated good, indicating a low risk of significant injuries in crashes according to the scale of severity employed in the IIHS's testing. The European New Car Assessment Programme (Euro NCAP) awarded the Leaf the highest five-star car safety rating, earning the following ratings for each criterion:

In the case of an accident in which the airbags are deployed, the Leaf automatically disconnects the high-voltage system. In December 2010, Nissan also advised first responders to manually disconnect both the high voltage and 12 V systems before performing any first response actions.

The Nissan Leaf's battery pack is shielded from crash damage by structural steel reinforcement. In December 2011, Nissan reported that none of the around two dozen Leafs destroyed in the 2011 Tōhoku earthquake and tsunami caught fire, and that their batteries remained intact. , no fires after a crash have been reported in the U.S. associated with the Leaf or other plug-in electric cars available in the market.

In 2011 electric vehicle warning sounds, to alert pedestrians of the Leaf's quiet movement relative to traditional motor vehicles, were introduced in anticipation of legislation mandating it in Europe, Japan, and America. This sound varies according to direction and acceleration, and is only active at low speeds. It can be disabled on some models. Actual legislation requiring this did not come into effect until 2019 in the EU; followed by the US in September 2020.  The vehicle's reverse chime has been described as "annoying" and "quite irritating".

Awards 
At the 2010 Washington Auto Show, the Leaf was given the Green Car Vision Award by the Green Car Journal, which said that the Leaf "will provide the features, the styling, and the driving experience that will meet the needs of a sophisticated and demanding market, while producing zero localized emissions and requiring no petroleum fuels." Popular Mechanics, upon awarding the Leaf its 2010 Breakthrough Award, explained that the Nissan Leaf is "not the first pure EV, but [...] hits the mainstream like none of its predecessors." Popular Mechanics also alluded to the Leaf's  range, which is said to be "enough for most commuters for the price of an average vehicle and with a much lower operating cost than gasoline-powered vehicles."

Other awards received by the Leaf include the 2011 European Car of the Year, EV.com's 2011 EV of the Year, 2011 Eco-Friendly Car of the Year by Cars.com, 2011 Green Fleet Electric Vehicle of the Year, it was listed among the 2011 Greenest Vehicles of the Year by the American Council for an Energy-Efficient Economy, also listed by Mother Earth News among its "Best Green Cars" of 2011, and also was ranked first in Kelley Blue Book Top 10 Green Cars for 2011. The Leaf won the 2011 World Car of the Year, and was a finalist for the 2011 World Green Car. Ward's Auto listed the Leaf's 80 kW electric motor in Ward's 10 Best Engines for 2011. Until October 2011 the Leaf was ranked as the most efficient EPA certified vehicle for all fuels ever. In December 2011, the Leaf was awarded with the 2011–2012 Car of the Year Japan at the Tokyo Motor Show.

Motorsport
An Electric Production Class was formed for the 2011 Pikes Peak International Hill Climb and Chad Hord raced a Leaf in the event. The off-road racing driver ascended the  course in 14 minutes and 33 seconds to win the class.  The interior of the car was removed and replaced with mandatory racing seats, safety harness, and a roll cage.

Leaf Nismo
The Nissan Leaf Nismo Concept shown at the 2011 Tokyo Motor Show features an extreme body kit that includes an aerodynamic front bumper, a rear undershield, rear diffuser, extended side skirts and 18-inch alloy wheels.

Gallery

Second generation (ZE1; 2017)

In October 2017, for the 2018 model year, Nissan launched the new generation Leaf in Japan, and deliveries in North America and Europe began in February 2018. In 2018, global sales reached a record level of 87,149 units, third behind the Tesla Model 3 and the BAIC EC-Series.

Mechanically, the second generation Leaf is similar to the first, while adding more range, and more power. Stylistically, it is a major departure from the previous model. The interior adds Android Auto & Apple CarPlay.

It charges through either a 6.6 kW regular plug (SAE J1772 in US/Japan, or a Type 2 connector in EU countries) or a 50 kW CHAdeMO, and has the ability to send power back to the grid.

Propilot Assist, a lane centering system, is available on the two highest trim levels for an additional cost, and has automatic parking in some markets. The car offers one-pedal braking where easing off the accelerator pedal causes significant regenerative braking, to the point where the vehicle can be brought to a complete stop without the driver touching the brake pedal, at which point hydraulic brakes are automatically applied, to hold the vehicle in position.

From 2019, a Leaf e+ (Leaf Plus in North America) variant has been offered. It can use CHAdeMO chargers up to 100 kW.

In September 2020, Nissan showed off a novel UK prototype emergency services version of the Leaf for natural disaster response, dubbed the RE-LEAF, based on the 62 kWh LEAF e+ (sold in the U.S. as the Plus). It is intended to serve as a reliable mobile power source for a small command center, offering weatherproof external power outlets for site lighting, tools or emergency medical equipment. Other modifications include a cargo area in place of the rear seats, separated from the passenger area by a cage, a rear hatch area that opens to a workstation area with pull-out computer desk and  LCD monitor, and roof-mounted emergency lights. While there was no word of an actual production version, the concept was well-received in the automotive, EV and tech media.

In June 2022, the Leaf got a face lift for the 2023 model year.

Trim lines

Europe 
European Leafs are offered in the following trim lines: Visia, Acenta, N-Connecta, and Tekna.

The N-Connecta adds from Acenta an intelligent around view monitor with moving object detection and front and rear parking sensors, part synthetic leather and cloth trim, heat pack with heated seats and heated steering wheel, 43 centimetre (17 inch) alloy wheels, and privacy glass.

Tekna adds from N-Connecta ProPILOT Advanced Driver Assistance System, Bose speakers, part leather seats with Ultrasuede trim, LED fog lamps with cornering function, and electronic parking brake.

North America 
The North American Leafs were initially sold in S, SV and SL trim lines. In 2018, for the 2019 model year, the S Plus, SV Plus, and SL Plus trims were added. The S and SV trim levels can be had with either the Leaf or Leaf Plus battery pack. The SL is only available in the Leaf Plus configuration.

The Mexican model arrived on 24 August 2018 as a 2019 model, and was offered in S, SL, and SL Bitono trim lines.

Production history

2020 
In celebration of World EV Day, 9 September 2020, Nissan marked the production of the 500,000th LEAF.

Awards
The Leaf was chosen as one of the Top 10 Tech Cars by the IEEE in 2018.

Global sales
The production version was unveiled in August 2009. After receiving 20,000 pre-orders in the United States, Nissan stopped taking reservations in the United States until early 2011. Production in Japan started in October 2010, and delivery in the US and Japan began in December, with deliveries in other markets beginning in early 2012. By December 2020 the Leaf was sold in 59 markets around the world.

The Leaf was the world's best selling electric car from 2011 to 2014 and 2016. By early 2020, the Tesla Model 3 surpassed the Leaf to become the new best selling electric car in history.

By February 2022, global Leaf deliveries totaled 577,000 cars. , Europe listed as the biggest market with more than 208,000 units sold, of which, 72 620 units have been registered in Norway, the leading European country market. , U.S. sales totaled 165,710 units through December 2021, and 157,059 units in Japan.

In popular culture
The Nissan Leaf is the subject of Roger McGough's poem "Ode to the Leaf", from his 2012 collection As Far As I Know.

See also
 Electric car use by country
 List of best-selling automobiles
 List of production battery electric vehicles
 Revenge of the Electric Car: 2011 American film documenting how the electric car was brought to world markets.
 Zero-emissions vehicle: a vehicle that emits no exhaust gas from the onboard source of power.

References

External links

 

Leaf
Compact cars
Production electric cars
Cars introduced in 2010
2020s cars
Hatchbacks
Front-wheel-drive vehicles
Euro NCAP small family cars